Mount Wonvara or Wonvagre (Hiw Wōnvar̄e ) is the highest point of Hiw, the northernmost island of Vanuatu.

References

Wonvara
Hiw Island